Diana Rasimovičiūtė (born 25 February 1984, in Ignalina) is a Lithuanian biathlete. Her event is the biathlon (10 km pursuit and 7.5 km sprint). She placed 18th in the 7.5 km sprint, 27th in the 10 km pursuit and 66th in the 15 km individual at the 2006 Winter Olympics.

References

External links 
 
 

1984 births
Lithuanian female biathletes
Living people
Olympic biathletes of Lithuania
Biathletes at the 2002 Winter Olympics
Biathletes at the 2006 Winter Olympics
Biathletes at the 2010 Winter Olympics
Biathletes at the 2014 Winter Olympics
Biathletes at the 2018 Winter Olympics
People from Ignalina